With flying colours is a proverbial phrase in the English language.

Flying Colors or Flying Colours may refer to:

Business
 Flying Colours Airlines, a UK charter airline that operated for 4 years between 1996 and 2000

Books
 Flying Colours (novel), a 1938 Horatio Hornblower novel written by C.S. Forester

Film and TV
 Flying Colors (1917 film), a silent American action film
 Flying Colors (2015 film), a Japanese film

Music
 Flying Colors (band), American musical supergroup
 Flying Colors (musical), a 1932 musical
 Flying Colours (Bliss n Eso album), 2008
 Flying Colours (Chris de Burgh album), 1988
 Flying Colors (Flying Colors album), 2012
 Flying Colors (Robert Ellis Orrall album), 1992; or the title song
 Flying Colors (Ricky Ford album), 1980
 Flying Colours (Shad album), 2013
 Flying Colors (Trooper album), 1979
 "Flying Colours", a song from the 1982 album The Broadsword and the Beast by Jethro Tull